Zdravko Zovko (born 28 May 1955) is a retired Croatian handball player.

Career
Zovko spent his entire playing career in RK Medveščak from Zagreb and in Syracuse, Sicily, for C.C. Ortigia. He won three Yugoslav Cups with the club and during his last season at the club got to the semi-finals of the EHF Cup Winners' Cup.
In Italy he won three italian championship in a row.

Zovko competed in the 1984 Summer Olympics, representing Yugoslavia. He played in six matches and contributed with five goals to win the gold medal. Apart for winning the Olympic gold Zovko won a silver and bronze medal for Yugoslavia at the 1982 & 1974 World Championships.

As a manager he has coached RK Zagreb, KC Veszprém and RK Podravka, before joining Zvezda Zvenigorod in May 2011.

In April 2013 Zovko became the assistant coach of Slavko Goluža in the Croatian national handball team.

Honours

Player
Medveščak Zagreb
Yugoslav Cup (3): 1978, 1983, 1986

Ortigia Siracusa
Serie A (3): 1987, 1988, 1989

Coach
Zagreb
Yugoslav First League (1): 1990–91
Croatian First League (4): 1991–92, 1992–93, 1993–94 1999–00
Croatian Cup (4): 1992, 1993, 1994, 2000
European Champions Cup (2): 1991–92, 1992–93, Finalist (1): 1999–00
European Super Cup (1): 1993

Celje
First Slovenian League (3): 1995–96, 1996–97, 1997–98
Slovenian Cup (3): 1996, 1997, 1998

Veszprem
Hungarian First League (5): 2001–02, 2002–03, 2003–04, 2004–05, 2005–06
Magyar Kupa (5): 2002, 2003, 2004, 2005, 2007
EHF Champions League Finalist (1): 2001–02
EHF Men's Champions Trophy Finalist (1): 2002

Podravka Koprivnica
Croatian First League (3): 2007–08, 2008–09, 2009–10
Croatian Cup (3): 2008, 2009, 2010

Dunaferr	
EHF Cup (1): 2015–16

Individual
Best handball coach in Croatia by SN & CHF: 1994, 1995 and 2002

Orders
 Order of Danica Hrvatska with face of Franjo Bučar – 1995

References

External links
Profile on Database Olympics

Női kézi NB I: Danyi Gábor és Zdravko Zovko is távozik a Siófoktól – hivatalos

1955 births
Living people
Croatian male handball players
RK Medveščak Zagreb players
RK Zagreb coaches
Handball players at the 1984 Summer Olympics
Olympic handball players of Yugoslavia
Yugoslav male handball players
Olympic gold medalists for Yugoslavia
Croatian handball coaches
Olympic medalists in handball
Croatian expatriate sportspeople in Hungary
Croatian expatriate sportspeople in Russia
People from Brod, Bosnia and Herzegovina
Medalists at the 1984 Summer Olympics
Mediterranean Games gold medalists for Yugoslavia
Competitors at the 1979 Mediterranean Games
Competitors at the 1983 Mediterranean Games
Competitors at the 1993 Mediterranean Games
Mediterranean Games gold medalists for Croatia
Mediterranean Games medalists in handball
Croats of Bosnia and Herzegovina